Göran Klemme (born 7 July 1964) is a Swedish darts player who plays in British Darts Organisation events.

Career

Klemme made his name in the 2005 Winmau World Masters. He defeated Bobby George, Gary Robson and John Walton on the way to the final, where he played reigning BDO world champion Raymond van Barneveld. Klemme took the first three sets, but ultimately lost the final by 7 sets to 3.

Klemme qualified for the 2007 BDO World Darts Championship, but was beaten 3 sets to 0 by Mike Veitch in the first round. After a preliminary round exit from the 2007 International Darts League, he took a break from darts.

He returned to darts in 2010, beating Finland's Veijo Viinikka to win the Swedish Open.

World Championship results

BDO

 2007: 1st Round (lost to Mike Veitch 0–3)

External links
Profile and stats on Darts Database

Living people
Swedish darts players
1964 births
British Darts Organisation players